Ajet, AJet, AJET, ajet may refer to:

Helios Airways, later renamed to "AJet" (αjet), a Cypriot airline
Australasian Journal of Educational Technology
Africa Journal of Evangelical Theology
"Association of Japan Exchange and Teaching" (AJET), support association for the JET Programme
AJET Holdings, the parent company to Ryan International Airlines

Surnamed "Ajet"

See also
 11 Squadron (Belgium), "AJeTS", the Belgian Advanced Jet Training School